Ilisiakos Football Club is an Athens-based football club that was founded in 1927 by Michalis Xydis, Lambropoulos, Evgenopoulos, Nikolaos Plessas, et al.. They played in Delta Ethiniki until 2003. Ilisiakos spent the majority of its later history in the Greek second division; however, the footballing arm of the club merged with Egaleo F.C. in August 2009 and was renamed as Egaleo. This merger was cancelled by Greek courts.

History
Ilisiakos is one of the oldest known sports clubs in Greece. It was founded in the last century, in 1927, with registration number in the HFF No. 15.

Prior to the founding of Ilisiakos, Dafni Ilisia pre-existed in 1924, as an independent association which competed in an open space (plot), located east of the Hilton Hotel, between Hatzigianni Mexi, Iridanou and Vasilissis Sofias streets.

In this team, which was the leaven for the establishment of Ilisiakos, Spyros Kollimenos played as a goalkeeper, Thanassis Kavouras, Lefteris Nautis, Athanasios Portelanos and others, who then formed the core of the newly formed team of El.

So in 1927 Ilisiakos was born, by some romantic and dreamy young people of that time (Michalis Xydis, Livaditis, Lambropoulos, Eugenopoulos, Plessas etc.) with only a part of football, initially included in the Third Athens EPSA, of which he was also Founding member, playing in various stadiums such as the Panhellenic, the Gymnastics Academy in Daphne and Panathinaikos.

Michalis Xydis, a well-known climber and pioneer of the association's founding, is said to have been the godfather of the name "Ilisiakos".

Rumors have it that the name was given by its founder, in honor of the "Elysian Fields", the place where the brave went when they fell in battle. (That is why it is also written with "H" instead of "I"). According to official data, Elysiakos was based in the Coupons (as the area was called in the 19th century) and not the Ilisia, since the borders of the Coupons were the Ilisos River and covered the fans of a wider area of Athens (Center, Pagrati, Kaisariani, Ampelokipi, Goudi, etc.) and not only a certain district.

The original emblem for the club was the footballer in action, to be soon replaced by a laurel-crowned Ita, which has since been established and remains unchanged to this day. The spelling of the word Elysiakos at that time was written in two sigmas, "Ilisiakos", with colors yellow and black.

The first stadium, where they played until 1951, was located in Ilisia, east of the Ilissos River, between Alkmanos, Potamianou and Antimachou streets, where the Crowne Plaza Hotel is now located. They played in this stadium until 1951, participating in the local championships of EPSA.

Players

Current squad

External links
Official website 

Football clubs in Attica
Association football clubs established in 1927
1927 establishments in Greece
Gamma Ethniki clubs